was the eldest son of the Japanese regent (Kampaku) Fujiwara no Tadazane and a member of the politically powerful Fujiwara clan. He was the father of Fujiwara no Kanefusa and Jien.

In the Hōgen Rebellion of 1156, Tadamichi sided with the Emperor Go-Shirakawa, while his brother Fujiwara no Yorinaga sided with Emperor Sutoku.

In 1162, he ordained as a Buddhist monk and took the Dharma name Enkan (円観).

Marriage and Children
Parents
Father: Fujiwara no Yorinaga (藤原 頼長, May 1120 – August 1, 1156)
Mother: Minamoto no Moroko (源師子), daughter of Minamoto no Akifusa (源顕房)
Consort and issue:
 Wife: Fujiwara no Soshi (藤原宗子, 1190 – 1155), daughter of Fujiwara no Munemichi (藤原宗通)
 Fujiwara no Kiyoko (藤原 聖子 ; 1122-1182), Wife of Emperor Sutoku, first daughter
 Third son (d.1127)
 Wife: Minamoto no Nobuko (源信子),  daughter of Minamoto no Norinobu (源国信)
 Konoe Motozane  (近衛 基実, 1143 – August 23, 1166), fourth son
 Wife: Minamoto no Toshiko (源俊子), daughter of Minamoto no Norinobu (源国信), younger sister of Nobuko
 Fujiwara no Motofusa (藤原 基房, 1144 – February 1, 1230), fifth son
 Shinen (1153 – 1224), ninth son
 Saichu, thirteenth son
 Wife: Minamoto no Toshiko (源俊子), daughter of Minamoto no Akitoshi (源顕俊)
 Fujiwara no Ikushi  (藤原 育子; 1146 – September 23, 1173), Wife of Emperor Nijō, second daughter
 Wife: Kaga no Tsubone (加賀局), daughter of Fujiwara no Nakamitsu (藤原仲光)
 Fujiwara no Kanezane  (藤原 兼実, 1149 – May 3, 1207), sixth son
 Doen (1151-1170), eight son
 Fujiwara no Kanefusa  (藤原 兼房, 1153 – March 30, 1217), tenth son
 Jien (慈円, 17 May 1155 in Kyoto – 28 October 1225), eleventh son
 Wife: Daughter of Fujiwara no Motonobu (藤原基信)
 Eshin (恵信, 1114 – 1171), first son
 Wife: Lady Gōjō (五条), daughter of Minamoto no Moritsune (源盛経)
 Takadata (尊忠; b.1150), seventh son
 Wife Unknown
 Kakuchu (覚忠; 1118 – 1177), Priest, second son

References

1097 births
1164 deaths
Sesshō and Kampaku
Regents of Japan
Fujiwara clan
People of Heian-period Japan
Hyakunin Isshu poets
Heian period Buddhist clergy
12th-century Japanese calligraphers